Bakel is a village east of Helmond and Eindhoven in southern part of the Netherlands. The total population is approximately 5,000. Until 1997, it formed the municipality of Bakel and Milheeze together with Milheeze. In 1997 Bakel merged with the Gemert municipality.

Bakel does not have old buildings, with the exception of the St Willibrordus Church which is the oldest in the area. This church was modernized during the 1970s, but regained some of the original style of decoration during the 1990s.

The area surrounding Bakel is heavily forested; the agricultural economy is dominated by the bio industry. It has the highest pig density in the Netherlands.

History 
The village was first mentioned in 715 as Bagoloso, and means "open forest on a ridge".

The St Willibrordus Church was built in the 16th century, but severely damaged by fire in 1708, and large rebuilt in 1721.

Bakel was home to 277 people in 1840.

Gallery

References 

Populated places in North Brabant
Gemert-Bakel